Anna is a 1987 American comedy drama film directed by Yurek Bogayevicz and starring Sally Kirkland, Robert Fields, Paulina Porizkova, Steven Gilborn and Larry Pine. It was adapted by Agnieszka Holland from an unauthorized story by Holland and Bogayevicz, based on the real-life relationship of Polish actresses Elżbieta Czyżewska and Joanna Pacuła.

Kirkland was nominated for an Academy Award for Best Actress, and she won a Golden Globe Award for Best Actress in a Motion Picture – Drama and an Independent Spirit Award for Best Female Lead.

Plot
Krystyna, an aspiring actress, journeys from her native Czechoslovakia to New York City in search of her idol Anna, an actress who was once famous in her homeland. Anna was imprisoned in Czechoslovakia after speaking out against the new regime after the 1968 Communist invasion, and was later banned from reentry to the country. Tonda, Anna's then-husband and a director of equally renown, was in Paris at the time of the invasion and has since become successful in the United States making music videos for MTV. Anna, who is now middle-aged and struggles to land parts in films and theatre, becomes a mentor for Krystyna and her fledgling acting career. 

As Anna manages to land a gig as an understudy for an off-Broadway play, she also tutors Krystyna fluency in the English language and gives her a makeover. Krystyna blossoms as Anna's protégée, but when she uses Anna's life experiences as fodder for a TV show, the women's friendship starts to show strain.

Cast

Critical reception
Sheila Benson of the Los Angeles Times wrote that Anna "is the best kind of surprise--a small, frequently funny, fine-boned film set in the worlds of the theater and movies which unexpectedly becomes a consummate study of love, alienation and loss." She described Kirkland's performance as "a blazing comet" and complimented Porizkova, Fields, and Maleczech. Though Benson critiqued director Bogayevicz's "melodramatist’s flair for sudden rainstorms to underscore emotional scenes", she said these touches were redeemed by the cast and Holland's ear for dialogue. Critic Emanuel Levy wrote, "Perhaps only a foreign screenwriter and a foreign director could have made the witty and cynical Anna, a movie about an expatriate Czech actress in New York, struggling with her progressive age, ruthless competition, sheer survival and other problems inherent in showbiz." 

Janet Maslin of The New York Times was less effusive and said the film was cliché-laden with too many unconvincing elements, though she praised Kirkland's performance. The film was likened by multiple critics as another version of All About Eve. Writing for The Spectator, Hilary Mantel commended Bogayevicz and Holland, writing "their careful thought and commitment is evident" and "they have allowed scope for a fine central performance — intense, observant and painful — by Sally Kirkland".

Accolades

Notes

References

External links
 
 
 

1987 films
Films featuring a Best Drama Actress Golden Globe-winning performance
Vestron Pictures films
1987 directorial debut films
1987 comedy-drama films
1987 independent films
American comedy-drama films
Films about immigration to the United States
Films about actors
Films about theatre
Films set in New York City
Films shot in New York City
1980s female buddy films
1980s English-language films
Films directed by Yurek Bogayevicz
1980s American films